= Managing editor =

Senior member of a publication's management team

A managing editor (ME) oversees production of a publication. Typically, the managing editor reports directly to the editor-in-chief and oversees all aspects of the publication.

== United States ==
In the United States, a managing editor of a newspaper, magazine or other periodical publication oversees and coordinates the publication's editorial activities. The managing editor can hire, fire, or promote staff members. Other responsibilities include creating and enforcing deadlines. Most section editors will report to the managing editor. The ME must enforce policies set by the editor in chief. It is their job to approve stories for print or final copy. On matters of controversy, the ME decides whether to run controversial pieces. At a newspaper a managing editor usually oversees news operations while opinion pages are under separate editors.

In trade book publishing, the managing editor is typically a senior executive in the production department, responsible for overall supervision of the copy-editing, typesetting, proofreading and other steps in initial production, as well as supervision of the production process for reprints of existing titles.

In marketing departments, the managing editor is responsible for developing content marketing strategy and overseeing content production.

== United Kingdom ==
In the United Kingdom a managing editor tends to manage budget, staffing, and scheduling for a publication, and may have equivalent ranking to a deputy editor in the organization's structure.

== Television ==
The title also applies to the evening televised newscasts, such as those on ABC, CNN, CBS, NBC, PBS, and Fox News. The anchors of these newscasts also work as the managing editor of their newscasts. Responsibilities vary in different companies. The managing editor – if a station has this position – manages the more day-to-day operations of the newsroom.
